Fred Louis Miller (born August 10, 1931) is a former American football offensive tackle in the National Football League for the Washington Redskins.  He played college football at the University of the Pacific.

1931 births
Living people
American football offensive tackles
Pacific Tigers football players
Santa Monica Corsairs football players
Washington Redskins players
Players of American football from San Francisco